Malaysia competed at the 2022 ASEAN Para Games in Surakarta, Indonesia from 30 July to 6 August 2022. The Malaysian contingent consisted of 73 athletes and 43 officials where it is the smallest contingent sent to the games since the first edition in 2001.

Overall, Malaysia won 36 golds more than the previous target of 16 golds.

Medal summary

Medal by sport

Medal by date

Medalists

Competitors

Badminton

Goalball 

Squad

Badrul Hisam Musa
Mohamad Firdaus Ngatiman
Muhammad Amirul Ahmad
Muhammad Haiqal Azani Azman
Muhammad Noorhelmie Mohd Rabi
Partiban Perumal

Sitting volleyball 

Squad

Arif Ridzuan Ab Nasir 
Mohd Shaharudin Abd Karim
Muhammad Shahrul Irfan Abd Razak	
Harman Halion
Fakri Raimi Razak
Fadzan Mat Isa
Yuvarajah Thijagarajah	
Mohd Shahmil Md Saad
Muhammad Nazrul Sabtu	
Amir Safuan Wahab
Muhammad Syahril Abd Hamid

Wheelchair tennis

References

External links 
 PCM-11th ASEAN Para Games Solo 2022 Web page

Nations at the ASEAN Para Games
2022 in Malaysian sport